George Henry Morrison (1 February 1873 – 8 August 1942) was an Australian rules footballer who played with St Kilda in the Victorian Football League (VFL).

Making his debut in 1897, the inaugural VFL season, Morrison played six games for St Kilda until the end of the 1899 VFL season.

References

External links 

1873 births
1942 deaths
Australian rules footballers from Melbourne
St Kilda Football Club players
People from North Melbourne